Fourth Wall is the second studio album by English rock band The Flying Lizards, released in 1981 by record label Virgin. The album features numerous collaborators, including Robert Fripp.

Reception 

Trouser Press called it "well-produced and interesting as individual songs, but it fails to jell as an album".

Track listing
All tracks are composed by David Cunningham except where indicated.

Tracks that were originally on side 1 of the LP:
"Lovers and Other Strangers" (David Cunningham, Patti Palladin, Steve Beresford)
"Glide/Spin" (Cunningham, Palladin)
"In My Lifetime"
"Cirrus"
"A-Train" (Cunningham, Palladin)
"New Voice"

Tracks that were originally on side 2 of the LP:
"Hands 2 Take" (Nyman, Cunningham, Palladin)
"An Age"
"Steam Away"
"Move On Up" (Curtis Mayfield)
"Another Story"
"Lost and Found" (Cunningham, Robert Fripp)

Personnel
Patti Palladin - vocals
David Cunningham - effects, guitar, harmonica, keyboards, percussion, violin, vocals
Julian Marshall - keyboards, vocals
J.J. Johnson - drums
with:
Robert Fripp - guitar on "Glide/Spin" and "Lost and Found"
Steve Beresford - bass, guitar, keyboards on "Lovers and Other Strangers"
Peter Gordon - saxophone on "Glide/Spin"
Val Haller - bass on "In My Lifetime" and "A-Train"
Gareth Sager - saxophone on "A-Train"
Cheryl Lewis - vocals on "New Voice"
Michael Nyman - piano on "Hands 2 Take"
Keith Thompson - baritone saxophone on "Hands 2 Take"
Ben Grove - bass on "Hands 2 Take"
Steve Saunders - trombone on "Hands 2 Take"
Anne Barnard - horns on "Hands 2 Take"
Edward Pillinger, Rory Allam - bass clarinet on "Hands 2 Take"
Lucie Skeaping, Nick Hayley - rebec on "Hands 2 Take"
Technical
Al Williams, Dave Hunt, John Strudwick, Rob Doran - engineer
David Cunningham, Laurie-Rae Chamberlain - artwork

References

External links 

 

1981 albums
The Flying Lizards albums
Virgin Records albums